Rear-Admiral of the United Kingdom is a now honorary office generally held by a senior (possibly retired) Royal Navy admiral, though the current incumbent is a retired Royal Marine General. Despite the title, the Rear-Admiral of the United Kingdom is usually a full admiral. He is the deputy to the Vice-Admiral of the United Kingdom, who is in turn deputy to the Lord High Admiral of the United Kingdom (an office that was vested from 1964 to 2011 in the Sovereign and from 2011 to 2021 in The Duke of Edinburgh).

He is appointed by the Sovereign on the nomination of the First Sea Lord. The Admiral usually retires at 70 years of age, but there have been admirals, such as Thomas Cochrane, 10th Earl of Dundonald, who have been over 80 before they retired from their office.

Rear-Admirals of England
Arthur Herbert, 1st Earl of Torrington 1683–1687 
Sir Roger Strickland 12 December 1687 – 13 December 1688
Sir Cloudesley Shovell 6 January 1705 N.S. – 1 May 1707

Rear-Admirals of Great Britain
Sir Cloudesley Shovell 1 May 1707 – 23 October 1707
vacant
Sir John Leake 24 May 1709 – 1 August 1714
vacant
Matthew Aylmer, 1st Baron Aylmer 18 March 1719 N.S. – 18 August 1720
George Byng, 1st Viscount Torrington October 1720 – 17 January 1733
Sir John Jennings 27 February 1733 N.S. – 1743
Thomas Mathews 18 February 1743 – 1749
Sir William Rowley 4 July 1749 – 1763
Edward Hawke, 1st Baron Hawke 4 January 1763 – 5 November 1765
Sir Charles Knowles 5 November 1765 – October 1770
Francis Holburne October 1770 – 14 July 1771
George Brydges Rodney, 1st Baron Rodney 17 August 1771 – 6 November 1781
George Darby 6 November 1781 – 1790
Alexander Hood, 1st Viscount Bridport 6 April 1790 – March 1796
Sir William Cornwallis March 1796 – 1 January 1801

Rear-Admirals of the United Kingdom
Sir William Cornwallis 1 January 1801 – 14 May 1814
Sir William Young 14 May 1814 – 18 July 1819
James Saumarez, 1st Baron de Saumarez 18 July 1819 – 21 November 1821
William Carnegie, 7th Earl of Northesk 21 November 1821 – 28 May 1831
Sir Thomas Foley 14 June 1831 – 9 January 1833
Sir George Martin 23 January 1833 – April 1834
Sir Robert Stopford April 1834 – 5 May 1847
Sir Thomas Byam Martin 5 May 1847 – 10 August 1847
Sir George Cockburn, 10th Baronet 10 August 1847 – 19 August 1853
Sir William Hall Gage 24 October 1853 – 6 November 1854
Thomas Cochrane, 10th Earl of Dundonald, 1st Marquess do Maranhão 6 November 1854  – 31 October 1860
Sir Graham Hamond, 2nd Baronet 22 November 1860 – 5 June 1862
Sir Francis William Austen 5 June 1862 – 11 December 1862
Sir William Parker, 1st Baronet 11 December 1862 – 16 May 1863
Sir George Francis Seymour 16 May 1863 – 23 September 1865
Sir William Bowles 23 September 1865 – 26 November 1866
Sir Phipps Hornby 26 November 1866 – 19 March 1867
Sir Fairfax Moresby 20 April 1867 – 17 July 1869
Sir Provo Wallis 17 July 1869 – 12 February 1870
Sir William James Hope-Johnstone 12 February 1870 – 11 July 1878
Sir William Fanshawe Martin, Bt 19 September 1878 – 24 March 1895
abolished under Queen Victoria; revived by King Edward VII
Sir Edmund Robert Fremantle 25 July 1901 – 31 December 1926
Sir Stanley Cecil James Colville 31 December 1926 – 22 March 1929
Sir Montague Edward Browning 22 March 1929 – 13 February 1939
Sir Hubert George Brand 13 February 1939 – 19 June 1945
Sir Percy Lockhart Harnam Noble 19 June 1945 – 25 July 1955
Sir John Hereward Edelsten 10 October 1955 – 12 October 1962
Sir John Peter Lorne Reid 12 October 1962 – 11 March 1966
Sir Alexander Noel Campbell Bingley 11 March 1966 – 1972
Sir Nigel Stuart Henderson 11 January 1973 – 12 April 1976
Sir John Fitzroy Duyland Bush 29 April 1976 – 1 August 1979
Sir William Donough O'Brien 1 August 1979 – 1984
Sir Leslie Derek Empson 1984 – 13 November 1986
Sir Anthony Templer Frederick Griffith Griffin 13 November 1986 – 29 October 1988
Sir Anthony Storrs Morton 29 October 1988 – 24 November 1988
Sir James Henry Fuller Eberle 24 November 1988 – 17 January 1994
Sir Nicholas John Streynsham Hunt 17 January 1994 – 6 November 1997
Sir Jeremy Black 6 November 1997 – 30 April 2001
Sir Kenneth Eaton 30 April 2001 – 2007
Sir Gordon Messenger 6 December 2021  present

See also
Lieutenant of the Admiralty
Admiralty

References

Titles
Royal Navy
Royal Navy appointments
Maritime history of the United Kingdom
1683 establishments in England